101st Heavy SS Panzer Battalion  was a German heavy tank battalion in the Waffen-SS during World War II. With the introduction of new Tiger II tanks in late 1944, the unit was renumbered as the 501st Heavy SS Panzer Battalion.

Operational history
The battalion was created on July 19, 1943, as a part of the I SS Panzer Corps, by forming two new heavy tank companies consisting of Tiger I tanks and incorporating the 13th (Heavy) Company of the 1st SS Panzer Regiment. It was attached to 1st SS Panzer Division Leibstandarte and sent to Italy on August 23, 1943, where it stayed until mid-October. The 1st and 2nd company were then sent to the Eastern Front while the rest of the unit stayed in the West.

With the anticipated Allied invasion of Western Europe approaching, elements of the battalion in the East were ordered to the West in April 1944. On June 1, 1944, the battalion was located near Beauvais, north-west of Paris. Of its 45 Tigers, 37 were operational and eight more were under repair. With the D-Day landings on June 6, it was ordered to Normandy where it arrived on June 12 and 13. Fighting its first battle on 13 June, Kompanie 2, led by Michael Wittmann inflicted severe damage on the British in Villers-Bocage, resulting in the ending of Operation Perch. The battalion lost 15 of its 45 Tigers by July 5, including in the Battle of Villers-Bocage.

At this time the unit's surplus crews began outfitting with the new Tiger II tanks. By August 7 the division left in Normandy had 25 Tigers of which 21 were operational. On August 8, 1944, three of its seven Tigers, committed to a counter-attack near Saint-Aignan-de-Cramesnil, were destroyed by British Sherman Fireflies, and two more were destroyed by the 27th Canadian Armoured Regiment, killing Michael Wittmann. The battalion lost virtually all its remaining Tigers in the Falaise pocket and the subsequent German retreat from France.

On September 9, the remains of the unit were ordered to rest and refit with the new Tiger IIs. With this change on September 22, 1944, it was redesignated the 501st Heavy SS Panzer Battalion. On March 15, 1945, it reported a strength of 32 tanks, of which eight were operational. Four days later, Heinrich Kling was appointed as commander of the unit.

Commanders 
 SS-Sturmbannführer Heinz von Westernhagen (19 July 1943 - 8 November 1943)	
 SS-Obersturmführer Otto Leiner (8 November 1943 - 13 February 1944)	
 SS-Oberführer	Heinz von Westernhagen (13 February 1944 - 20 March 1945)	
 SS-Sturmbannführer Heinrich Kling (20 March - 8 May 1945)

See also
SS Panzer Division order of battle
Panzer Division

Notes

References

101
101
101
Military units and formations established in 1943
Military units and formations disestablished in 1945